Canine subvalvular aortic stenosis (SAS) is an abnormal, congenital heart murmur caused by subaortic stenosis (SAS). There is a high incidence of this condition identified in large and giant breed dogs like the Rottweiler, Newfoundland, Golden Retriever, Boxer, German Shepherd, English Bulldog, Great Dane, German Shorthaired Pointer, and Bouvier des Flandres.

It is a common congenital heart defect that consists of abnormal tissue located just below the aortic valve that creates an obstruction the heart has to overcome to pump blood out to the body. As a result, the heart muscle can become thickened. The blood is pumped at a higher speed and pressure across the stenosis into the aorta, creating a heart murmur.

This genetic trait is polygenic. An animal might have the genes for SAS, yet have no actual sign of SAS. Also, an animal might have signs of subaortic stenosis, and yet offspring with SAS may not demonstrate clinical signs for a couple of generations. Any animal that has subaortic stenosis should not be bred because they can pass the defect on to future offspring.

Symptoms 
In many cases, affected dogs do not show any signs. Aortic stenosis is often initially detected upon hearing a heart murmur during a routine physical examination by a veterinarian. In dogs with severe disease, you may observe signs related to heart dysfunction. These signs include lethargy, exercise intolerance, shortness of breath, and fainting. Signs of heart failure may also be seen in severe cases of aortic stenosis. These signs include coughing, increased breathing effort, and open-mouth breathing.

Puppies and adult dogs diagnosed with subaortic stenosis can suffer from heart failure and sudden death. If a dog with SAS develops heart failure, medications can be prescribed to alleviate the clinical signs (sudden/strong lethargicism, continuous heavy panting, rise in temperature etc.)

Diagnosis 
SAS is diagnosed via echocardiogram with Doppler performed by a veterinary cardiologist. This allows visualization of the four heart chambers and valves as well as the anatomy of the subaortic area. Doppler allows estimation of the pressure created in the heart by the stenosis.

An electrocardiogram (ECG) may be required in patients with an irregular heart rhythm. 

Heart murmurs are graded on a scale of one to six, with one being very mild and six being very serious. Murmurs can exist due to a large number of heart problems (infection, trauma, anemia, etc.). Conversely, some murmurs are benign and do not indicate cardiac pathology. 

The Orthopedic Foundation for Animals (OFA) has established a Congenital Heart Registry whose guidelines were established by veterinary cardiologists. A dog which auscultates normally at 12 months of age is considered to be free of congenital heart disease; upon confirmation of this, OFA will issue a certificate.

Treatment
Prognosis of canines with aortic stenosis depends on the severity of the disease. Mild stenosis usually does not affect longevity; however, the possibility of aortic endocarditis exists.

Administration of beta-blockers can decrease heart rate and prolong diastole and coronary filling, thereby reducing myocardial hypoxia and protect against arrhythmia. Dogs do clinically well on beta-blockers; however, a study proved no benefit in terms of survival versus untreated dogs with severe SAS.

References 

Dog diseases